The 3rd Parliament of Ontario was in session from 18 January 1875 until 25 April 1879, following the 1875 general election in which the Liberal Party was returned as the majority party. Oliver Mowat was again the province's Premier.

The Ontario Liquor Licence Act, 1876 (often referred to as the Crooks Act), which transferred control of licenses for the sale of alcohol from individual municipalities to commissioners appointed by the province, was passed.

Rupert Mearse Wells served as speaker for the assembly.

Members of the Legislature

Election trials
The early months of this Parliament were marred by election trials in many
ridings. Most of these cases challenged the validity of the election results
on such charges as bribery or corruption. A common accusation was that of
"treating", where candidates or their agents would buy potential electors
alcohol or other favours.

The following ridings and candidates were affected:

Source: .

References 
Ontario Legislative Assembly official website . Retrieved 9 March 2007

1875 establishments in Ontario
1879 disestablishments in Ontario
03